Andreas Holst Jensen (born 1 December 1994) is a Danish handball player for Montpellier Handball and the Danish national team.

Achievements
EHF Champions League
 Runner-up: 2021
Danish Handball League
 Winner: 2019, 2020, 2021
 Runner-up: 2022
Danish Cup
 Winner: 2018, 2021
 Runner-up: 2020
Danish Super Cup
 Winner: 2019, 2020, 2021
IHF Super Globe
 Bronze medal: 2021

References

1994 births
Living people
Danish male handball players
People from Lemvig
Aalborg Håndbold players
Montpellier Handball players
Expatriate handball players
Danish expatriate sportspeople in France